Papà diventa mamma is a 1952 Italian comedy film written, directed, produced and starred by Aldo Fabrizi.  The production company was Alfa Film XXXVII.

Cast
 Aldo Fabrizi: Sor Peppe
 Ave Ninchi: Margherita, wife of Peppe
 Giovanna Ralli: Marcella
 Carlo Delle Piane: Pecorino
 Giancarlo Zarfati: Gnappetta
 Paolo Stoppa: Il medico
 Marco Tulli: Ipnotizzato pugile
 Virgilio Riento:Ambrogio
 Luigi Pavese: Il Mago Bhorman
 Enrico Luzi: L'uomo che Balbetta
 Franco Giacobini: Il passeggero sul Tram
 Alfredo Rizzo

References

External links
 
 Papà diventa mamma at Variety Distribution

1952 films
1950s Italian-language films
Films directed by Aldo Fabrizi
Italian comedy films
1952 comedy films
Films set in Rome
Italian black-and-white films
1950s Italian films